Maike Ziech (born 10 September 1993) is a German judoka.

She is the gold medallist of the 2018 Judo Grand Prix Agadir in the -78 kg category.

References

External links
 

1993 births
Living people
German female judoka
21st-century German women